Calamochrous purpuralis is a moth in the family Crambidae that is found in Sri Lanka. It was described by George Hampson in 1908.

It has a wingspan of 22 mm.

References

Pyraustinae
Moths described in 1908